Kulgan (also Romanized as Kūlgān) is a village located in Nehzatabad Rural District, in the Central District of Rudbar-e Jonubi County, Kerman Province, Iran. At the 2006 census, its population was 1,007, in 224 families.

References 

Populated places in Rudbar-e Jonubi County